Moore-McMillen House is a historic home located at Egbertville, Staten Island, New York.  It was built in 1818 as the rectory for the Church of St. Andrew. It is a modest, two-story frame farmhouse set on a fieldstone foundation with a gambrel roof.  It features a small covered porch along the length of the main section.

It was added to the National Register of Historic Places in 1980.

References

Houses on the National Register of Historic Places in Staten Island
Federal architecture in New York (state)
Houses completed in 1818
New York City Designated Landmarks in Staten Island